Xenel is a diversified company based in Jeddah, Saudi Arabia.  Founded in 1973 by the descendants of one of the oldest trading houses in the Middle East. House of Alireza, Xenel - a spelling variation for family patriarch, the late Zainal Alireza - grew by establishing multiple joint ventures with international companies and in the process building its own expertise in energy, petrochemicals, construction, infrastructure development, healthcare, industrial services, information technologies, logistics, real estate and global investing. Khalid Alireza is the CEO of the Group.

Group Companies

Heavy Industries 

 Saudi Cable Company (SCC)
 Hidada Group

Health Care 

 AMI
 Imdad Medical Business Co. Ltd. is headquartered in Riyadh and has branches in Jeddah and Al-Khobar, and it has been working in the field of aesthetic medicine since 1991.

Transport, Logistics & Building Materials 

 Arabian Bulk Trade Limited (ABT)
 Binex
 Saudi Bulk Transport Limited (SBT)
 Saudi Scaffolding Factory (SSF)
 The International Company for Chemicals (ICC)

Agriculture Commodities 

 Agri Bulk Trade

Industrial Services 

 
 
 Saudi Miebach
 Arabian Services Group
 SSOC Trican
 AECOM Arabia
 Karam Fedics Services Company Ltd.
 Al-Karam Al-Arabi

Real Estate

References

External links
 Official website

Saudi Arabian companies established in 1973
Conglomerate companies established in 1973
Companies of Saudi Arabia
Companies based in Jeddah